Farrer is a suburb in the Canberra, Australia district of Woden. The postcode is 2607.

Name origin

Named for William James Farrer (1845–1906), who was a wheat-breeding pioneer, many of whose experiments were conducted at Lambrigg near Tharwa. The suburb's streets are named after agriculturalists, except for Lambrigg Street, which was the name of Farrer's property in Tharwa.

Location
It is next to the suburbs of Torrens, Mawson, Isaacs and the Tuggeranong suburb of Wanniassa. It is bordered by Beasley Street, Athllon Drive, and Yamba Drive. Located in this suburb is Farrer Primary School and neighborhood oval, a Croatian Catholic parish centre, the Serbian Orthodox Church of St Sava, a small shopping centre, the Long Gully scout hall and the Goodwin Village for elderly citizens.

General information
Farrer is a relatively large suburb for Canberra, with over 3,300 residents. It was named on 12 May 1966, after William James Farrer, who had lived in the area late in the 19th century, making a significant contribution to wheat-breeding in New South Wales by producing climate species, thus extending the wheat-belt and enabling the breeding of resistant wheat.

The suburb's size resulted in possession of its own oval, located next to the primary school, a scout hall for the local group named Long Gully. Four playgrounds are at various locations, with the main one 'Farrer Nature Play & Adventure Trail' adjacent to the Scout Hall.

The Farrer Ridge Nature Reserve, part of the Canberra Nature Park and half the suburb, provides for bushwalking and stunning vistas.

Geology
Deakin Volcanics green-grey and purple rhyodacite underlies the whole suburb.  Deakin Volcanics cream rhyolite occurs on the top of Farrer Ridge.
Quaternary alluvium can be found in the valley bottom.

Gallery

References

Suburbs of Canberra